is a Japanese-born American cartoonist and comic book creator. He is best known as the creator of the comic series Usagi Yojimbo.

Career
He began his career by lettering comic books (notably Groo the Wanderer by Sergio Aragonés and Mark Evanier) and wrote and illustrated The Adventures of Nilson Groundthumper and Hermy; a comic series with a medieval setting, influenced by Sergio Aragonés' Groo the Wanderer. The characters first appeared in Albedo #1 in 1984, and they were subsequently featured in issues of Critters, Grimjack, Amazing Heroes and Furrlough.

Sakai became famous with the creation of Usagi Yojimbo, the epic saga of Miyamoto Usagi, a samurai rabbit living in late-sixteenth and early-seventeenth-century Japan. First published in 1984, the comic continues to this day, with Sakai as the lone author and nearly sole artist (Tom Luth serves as the main colorist on the series, and Sergio Aragonés has made two small contributions to the series: the story "Broken Ritual" is based on an idea by Aragonés, and he served as a guest inker for the black-and-white version of the story "Return to Adachi Plain" that is featured in the Volume 11 trade paperback edition of Usagi Yojimbo). He also created a futuristic spinoff series Space Usagi. His favorite movie is Satomi Hakkenden (1959). The Japanese American National Museum in Los Angeles's Little Tokyo presented an exhibit entitled "Year of the Rabbit: Stan Sakai's Usagi Yojimbo" from July 9 through October 30, 2011.

Sakai wrote and illustrated the story "I'm Not in Springfield Anymore!" for Bart Simpson's Treehouse of Horror #7 and illustrated the back cover of Treehouse of Horror #6.

Sakai was the artist for Riblet, the back-up feature in the trade paperback of Stupid, Stupid Rat Tails.

In 2013, Sakai illustrated the limited comic book series 47 Ronin, an adaptation of the famed story of the 47 Ronin written by Dark Horse Comics Publisher Mike Richardson and with Lone Wolf and Cub writer Kazuo Koike as an editorial consultant.

The seventh episode of the 2012 Teenage Mutant Ninja Turtles animated series' fifth season, "Yojimbo", was written by Sakai and features Miyamoto Usagi, who has appeared in a few TMNT shows to date.

In 2020, it was announced that Sakai would serve as an executive producer on the upcoming Netflix original CGI animated series Samurai Rabbit: The Usagi Chronicles, which is based on "Usagi Yojimbo".

In April 2022, Sakai was reported among the more than three dozen comics creators who contributed to Operation USA's benefit anthology book, Comics for Ukraine: Sunflower Seeds, a project spearheaded by IDW Publishing Special Projects Editor Scott Dunbier, whose profits would be donated to relief efforts for Ukrainian refugees resulting from the February 2022 Russian invasion of Ukraine. Sakai's contribution is an original Usagi Yojimbo story in which the main character come to the aid of refugees fleeing the invasion of their land by a warlord, themes that speak to the events in Ukraine.

Awards
 1990 Parents' Choice Award for "Skillful weaving of facts and legends into his work"
 1991 Inkpot Award from Comic-Con International: San Diego for "Lifetime Achievement in the Field of Cartooning"
 1996 Eisner Award for "Best Letterer" (Groo and Usagi Yojimbo)
 1996 Eisner Award for "Talent Deserving of Wider Recognition" (Usagi Yojimbo)
 1999 Eisner Award for "Best Serialized Story" (Usagi Yojimbo "Grasscutter")
 1999 Haxtur Award for "Best Short Story [in Spain]" (Usagi Yojimbo "Noodles" [Spanish Edition])
 2000 Haxtur Award for "Best Script [in Spain]" (Usagi Yojimbo's "Grasscutter" [Spanish Edition])
 2001 Ursa Major Award for "Best Anthropomorphic Comic Book or Strip"
 2002 National Cartoonists Society Comic Book Division Awards (Usagi Yojimbo)
 2002 Ursa Major Award for "Best Anthropomorphic Comic Book or Strip"
 2003 Ursa Major Award for "Best Anthropomorphic Comic Book"
 2003 La Plumilla de Plata (Silver Inkpen Award) in Mexico for his lifetime achievements and contributions to comic books.
 2004 Ursa Major Award for "Best Anthropomorphic Other Literary Work" (The Art of Usagi Yojimbo) and "Best Anthropomorphic Comic Book" (Usagi Yojimbo)
 2005 Ursa Major Award for "Best Anthropomorphic Comic Book" (Usagi Yojimbo)
 2007 Harvey Award for "Best Letterer"
 2011 Cultural Ambassador Award
 2012 Eisner Award for "Best Lettering" (Usagi Yojimbo)
 2014 Inkwell Award for The All-in-One Award (47 Ronin, DHP, and Mouse Guard)
 2015 Eisner Award for "Best Lettering" (Usagi Yojimbo)
 2016 Harvey Award for "Best Cartoonist" (Usagi Yojimbo)
 2018 Eisner Award for "Best Lettering" (Usagi Yojimbo)
 2020 Eisner Award for "Best Archival Collection/Project" (Usagi Yojimbo)
 2020 Eisner Award for "Best Lettering"
 2020 Ringo Award for "Best Cartoonist" (Usagi Yojimbo)
 2020 Ringo Award for "Best Presentation" (Grasscutter Artist Select)
 2020 Ringo Award for "Best Single Issue or Story" (Usagi Yojimbo #6)

From 1993 through 2005, Stan Sakai has received twenty-one Eisner Award nominations. He has also been nominated for the Comics Buyer's Guide Award for Favorite Writer in 1999 and 2000. In 2020, Sakai was inducted into the Eisner Award Hall of Fame.

Bibliography

Usagi Yojimbo

Other works 
 47 Ronin (2014, Dark Horse) – collects #1–5, story by Mike Richardson, colors by Lovern Kindzierski, and letters by L. Lois Buhalis and Tom Orzechowski
 The Adventures of Nilson Groundthumper and Hermy (2014, Dark Horse) – collect stories from Albedo Anthropomorphics #1 and #5; Critters Special #1; Critters #5, 16, and 27; Usagi Yojimbo (vol. 1) #19; Usagi Yojimbo Color Special #1–3; Usagi Yojimbo (vol. 2) #9; and Dark Horse Presents (vol. 2) #30; colors by Ryan Hill and Tom Luth

Notes

References

External links

 
 Usagi Yojimbo's official website
 Sakai's LiveJournal page
 Comic Book Awards Almanac
 Stan Sakai – Video interview by the Japanese American National Museum, Discover Nikkei project (September 28, 2010)

Usagi Yojimbo
1953 births
Living people
American comics artists
American comics writers
Comic book letterers
Eisner Award winners
Eisner Award winners for Best Letterer/Lettering
American people of Japanese descent
Mirage Studios
People from Kyoto